The 2021–22 Charleston Southern Buccaneers men's basketball team represented Charleston Southern University in the 2021–22 NCAA Division I men's basketball season. The Buccaneers, led by 17th-year head coach Barclay Radebaugh, played their home games at the Buccaneer Field House in North Charleston, South Carolina as members of the Big South Conference. With the reintroduction of divisions for the first time since the 2013–14 season, the Buccaneers played in the South division. they finished the season 6–25, 1–15 in Big South play to finish in last place in the South division. As the No. 12 seed in the Big South tournament, they defeated UNC Asheville in the first round before losing to USC Upstate in the quarterfinals.

Previous season
In a season limited due to the ongoing COVID-19 pandemic, the Buccaneers finished the 2020–21 season 3–18, 2–15 in Big South play to finish in last place, before cancelling the remainder of their season on February 23, 2021 due to COVID-19 issues in the program.

Roster

Schedule and results

|-
!colspan=12 style=| Non-conference regular season

|-
!colspan=9 style=| Big South regular season

|-
!colspan=9 style=| Big South tournament

Sources

References

Charleston Southern Buccaneers men's basketball seasons
Charleston Southern Buccaneers
Charleston Southern Buccaneers men's basketball
Charleston Southern Buccaneers men's basketball